Xie Qiuping (born c. 1960) is a Chinese citizen who holds the record for world's longest hair. On 8 May 2004, her hair was measured to be 5.627 meters (18 ft 5.54 in). She began growing her hair to its current length in 1973 at the age of 13. She is the Guinness World Record holder for 2004.

References
Qiuping's entry in the Guinness Book of World Records
China’s best in bid to stand out January 28, 2005 Reuters article on The Telegraph, Calcutta, India
 Longest head hair (female) Guinness World Records 8 May 2004

People from Guangxi
Living people
1960s births
Year of birth uncertain
20th-century Chinese women
20th-century Chinese people
World record holders
Date of birth missing (living people)